Penny Coomes (born 6 April 1989) is a former English competitive ice dancer who represented Great Britain. With partner Nicholas Buckland, she is the 2014 European Figure Skating Championships bronze medalist and has won six other international medals. They are also five-time British national champions (2012, 2013, 2014, 2016 and 2018), and have competed three times at the Winter Olympics, in 2010, 2014 and 2018.

Personal life
Penny Coomes was born on 6 April 1989 in Maidenhead, England. She attended Wessex Primary School and Cox Green Secondary before moving to Nottingham. She learned ballet at Desborough School. She studied psychology at Nottingham Trent University. She is the stepdaughter of ice dancing coach Philip Askew. Coomes and Buckland were in a relationship for many years. On 24 December 2018, Coomes announced their engagement.

Career 
Coomes was introduced to skating by her mother at the age of eight at Slough Ice Arena.

Seasons: 2005–06 to 2009–10 
Coomes teamed up with Nicholas Buckland in 2005, having met him at the National Ice Centre in Nottingham. In the 2007–08 season, Coomes injured her foot in a collision with another skater at the British Championships. Told it was not broken, she and Buckland went on to win the national junior title. Three months later, a scan indicated a broken cuboid bone, leading to a bone graft and reconstructive surgery.

Coomes/Buckland made their senior international debut at the 2008 Finlandia Trophy, placing 9th. Their season ended after Coomes sustained a head injury in a fall on the ice. In the 2009–10 season, they placed 9th at the Ice Challenge in Graz, Austria, and fourth at the 2009 Ondrej Nepela Memorial. They won the silver medal at the British Championships and then won the bronze medal at the 2009 Golden Spin of Zagreb.

Coomes/Buckland trained at the National Ice Centre in Nottingham until December 2009 when they moved to New Jersey to train with coach Evgeni Platov. Along with Sinead Kerr / John Kerr, they were selected to represent Great Britain at the 2010 Winter Olympics in Vancouver. On 13 February 2010, Buckland began experiencing symptoms of tachycardia. She and Buckland finished 20th at the Olympics.

Seasons: 2010–11 to 2013–14 
In the 2010–11 season, they withdrew from their national championships after a fall in training resulted in a sprained ligament in Coomes' left knee. The two finished 14th at the European Championships and 16th at the World Championships.

In 2011–12, Coomes/Buckland placed fourth at their Grand Prix event, the 2011 Cup of China, before winning silver at the 2011 Golden Spin of Zagreb and gold at the Toruń Cup. The duo ranked sixth at the 2012 European Championships in Sheffield, England. They placed 14th at the 2012 World Championships in Nice, France. Coomes sustained a back and hip injury in Nice.

In 2012–13, they were fifth at the 2013 European Championships in Zagreb and 13th at the 2013 World Championships in London, Ontario. In July 2013, a device was implanted under Buckland's skin in order to monitor his heart rhythm.

In 2013–14, Coomes/Buckland won gold at the Ondrej Nepela Trophy in Bratislava. Following the event, Buckland was informed that he needed an operation due to readings of up to 270–280 beats per minute. In November 2013, a nerve in his heart was cauterized in a successful procedure leading to normal functioning of his heart. Coomes/Buckland went on to win the bronze medal at the 2014 European Championships in Budapest. They placed tenth at the 2014 Winter Olympics in Sochi.

2014–15 season 
Coomes/Buckland began the 2014–15 season with gold medals at the 2014 International Cup of Nice and NRW Trophy. In November, they were awarded the first Grand Prix medal of their career, bronze at the 2014 Rostelecom Cup. At their next GP event, the 2014 NHK Trophy, they placed second in the short dance but sixth in the free dance, slipping to fifth overall.

In late January 2015, Coomes/Buckland placed tenth in the short dance at the European Championships in Stockholm. They withdrew prior to the next segment, Buckland having fallen ill with gastroenteritis. Coomes developed an illness in the third week of March, resulting in her hospitalization and the team's withdrawal from the 2015 World Championships, to be held in Shanghai the following week. Back in the United Kingdom, she was diagnosed with nonspecific interstitial pneumonia.

2015–16 season 
In May 2015, Coomes/Buckand announced that they would be coached by Igor Shpilband in Michigan, following a directive by UK Sport, their funding agency. In October, they won silver at Ondrej Nepela Trophy, their first medal at an ISU Challenger Series competition. They placed 4th at the 2015 Trophée Éric Bompard, 5th at the 2015 NHK Trophy, 6th at the 2016 European Championships in Bratislava, and 7th at the 2016 World Championships in Boston.

2016–17 season 
Coomes fractured her patella on 24 June 2016, having fallen while trying a new lift entry with Buckland in Novi, Michigan; she underwent surgery four days later, wore a brace for ten weeks, and returned to the ice on 11 November. Coomes/Buckland withdrew from their Grand Prix assignments – the 2016 Trophée de France and 2016 NHK Trophy. They trained in preparation for the 2017 European Championships but later decided to withdraw. Coomes underwent an operation on 10 January 2017 to remove the wires in her knee, which were digging into the patellar tendon, and was expected to be off the ice for three months.

2017–18 season 

Coomes and Buckland started their 2017–18 season at the 2017 CS Nebelhorn Trophy, where they won the gold medal, set new personal bests in all segments and qualified an Olympic spot for Great Britain in ice dance at the 2018 games. They were assigned to the 2017 NHK Trophy in November due to a withdrawal from the competition where they placed 5th in the short dance and 9th in the free dance, finishing in 7th overall.

Coomes and Buckland started in the 2018 Winter Olympics in Pyeongchang, South Korea. Which was their third appearance of the Winter Olympic Games. On 19 February 2018, they finished in 10th place and received a scored of 68.36 for their short ice dance. On 20 February 2018, they finished in 10th place and received a scored of 101.96 in their free ice dance, and overall finished in 11th place with a 170.32 final score.

In 2018, it was announced that Coomes and Buckland, will not be attending the 2018 World Figure Skating Championships, in order to give Coomes's the opportunity to fully rehabilitate her knee.

In 2018, Coomes and Buckland worked as stunt doubles and consultants, on television drama called Torvill and Dean, based on the true story of Jayne Torvill and Christopher Dean. Which was broadcast on UK television on 25 December 2018.

Programmes 
(with Buckland)

Competitive highlights 
GP: Grand Prix; CS: Challenger Series; JGP: Junior Grand Prix

With Buckland

References

External links 

 
 
 NISA Squad GB

1989 births
Living people
Alumni of Nottingham Trent University
British female ice dancers
English female ice dancers
People from Maidenhead
Olympic figure skaters of Great Britain
Figure skaters at the 2010 Winter Olympics
Figure skaters at the 2014 Winter Olympics
Figure skaters at the 2018 Winter Olympics
European Figure Skating Championships medalists
Competitors at the 2009 Winter Universiade